Clarence Childs (born January 13, 1938) is a former American football defensive back and halfback. He played for the New York Giants from 1964 to 1967 and for the Chicago Bears in 1968.

References

1938 births
Living people
Sportspeople from Lakeland, Florida
Players of American football from Florida
American football defensive backs
American football halfbacks
Florida A&M Rattlers football players
New York Giants players
Chicago Bears players